Kyauktan Ye Le Pagoda (formally Kyaikhmawwun Yele Pagoda is a Buddhist pagoda located in Kyauktan Township, Yangon Region, on a small island in Hmaw Wun Creek, a tributary of Yangon River. The pagoda was built with many Buddha's relics inside.

Two things are noticed, the water level never rises to cover the pagoda, and there will always be enough room for everyone who come to visit the pagoda (meaning, even the pagoda has small room for visitors somehow it is always balanced out between those who is coming & leaving).

This unusual temple was built under King Bawgasena in the third century BCE. The temple hosts an impressive collection of paintings, sculptures and other fine demonstrations of Burmese Buddhist artwork and craftsmanship.

Gallery

See also
Kyaik Ne Ye Lay Pagoda- another pagoda in ocean

References

Buddhist temples in Yangon